Todds is an unincorporated community in Morgan County, in the U.S. state of Ohio.

History
A post office called Todds was established in 1855, and remained in operation until 1908. In 1886, Todds was one of five post offices within Marion Township.

References

Unincorporated communities in Morgan County, Ohio
Unincorporated communities in Ohio
1855 establishments in Ohio
Populated places established in 1855